"Love Among the Ruins" is an 1855 poem by Robert Browning. It is the first poem in the collection Men and Women.

Overview
The poem begins:

Browning here employs an unusual structure of rhyming couplets in which long trochaic lines are paired with short lines of three syllables. This may be related to the theme of the poem, a comparison between love and material glory.  The speaker, overlooking a pasture where sheep graze, recalls that once a great ancient city, his country's capital, stood there. After spending four stanzas describing the beauty and grandeur of the ancient city, the speaker says that "a girl with eager eyes and yellow hair/Waits me there", and that "she looks now, breathless, dumb/Till I come." The speaker, after musing further on the glory of the city and thinking of how he will greet his lover, closes by rejecting the majesty of the old capital and preferring instead his love:

In culture
Browning's poem inspired or gave its title to many subsequent works, including a painting by Edward Burne-Jones, a 1953 novel by Evelyn Waugh, a 1975 TV-movie with Katharine Hepburn and Laurence Olivier, an episode of the American TV series Mad Men, and an album and song by the band 10,000 Maniacs.

The poem is quoted by the character Rupert Birkin in Women in Love, a novel by D. H. Lawrence.

References

External links
Full text from an 1856 edition of Men and Women

Poetry by Robert Browning
1855 poems
British poems